See You at the Fair is an album by jazz saxophonist Ben Webster, released on Impulse! Records.

Reception

Allmusic awarded the album 5 stars with its review by Scott Yanow stating "Ben Webster's final American recording was one of his greatest. At 55, the tenor saxophonist was still very much in his prime but considered out of style in the U.S. He would soon permanently move to Europe where he was better appreciated".

Track listing
"Someone to Watch Over Me" (Gershwin, Gershwin) 4:30
"In a Mellow Tone" (Ellington, Gabler) 4:26
"Over the Rainbow" (Arlen, Harburg) 4:42
"Love Is Here to Stay"(Gershwin, Gershwin) 2:48
"The Single Petal of a Rose" [#] (Ellington) 3:20
"See You at the Fair" (Webster) 6:14
"Stardust" (Carmichael, Parish) 2:26
"Fall of Love" (Tiomkin, Washington) 2:46
"While We're Dancing" (Skylar, Vroman) 2:49
"Lullaby of Jazzland" (Albam, Ward) 3:04
"Midnight Blue" [#] (Hefti) 4:05
"Blues for Mr. Broadway" [#] (Brubeck) 8:10

Recorded at Van Gelder Studio, Englewood Cliffs (New Jersey) on March 11 (1-5), March 25 (6-10) and November 10 (11-12), 1964

[#] Not released on original LP

Personnel
1-10:
Ben Webster: tenor sax
Hank Jones: piano (1-5)
Roger Kellaway: piano (6-8), harpsichord (9-10)
Richard Davis: bass
Osie Johnson: drums

11-12:
Oliver Nelson: arranger, conductor, leader
Thad Jones: trumpet
Ben Webster: tenor sax
Phil Bodner: tenor sax, English horn
Phil Woods: tenor sax
Pepper Adams: baritone sax
Roger Kellaway: piano
Richard Davis: bass
Grady Tate: drums

Cover
The cover photo shows Ben Webster in front of the Unisphere sculpture, a spherical stainless steel representation of the Earth in Flushing Meadows–Corona Park in the New York City borough of Queens, designed for the 1964 New York World's Fair, the same year the record came out.

References

Ben Webster albums
1957 albums
Impulse! Records albums
Albums recorded at Van Gelder Studio
Albums conducted by Oliver Nelson
Albums arranged by Oliver Nelson
Albums produced by Bob Thiele